Lucia Kimani Mwahiki-Marčetić (born 21 June 1981) is a Kenyan-born Bosnian long-distance runner who holds four Bosnian records over different distances.

In 2004, she married her Bosnian Serb husband Siniša Marčetić. They met earlier that year in Salzburg, Austria, where they ran a half-marathon race. On 19 August 2005, they moved to Bosnia and Herzegovina and currently live in Banja Luka.  Her husband is from Prijedor. In 2006 Lucia received Bosnian citizenship.

Lucia was part of the Bosnian Olympic team at the 2008 Summer Olympics. She withdrew from the 2012 marathon race due to a back injury, but competed at the 2016 Rio Olympics. On 23 December 2008, she was voted the best Bosnian female athlete of 2008. She won the Skopje Marathon in 2010 and the Cracovia Marathon in 2012. In 2013, together with her husband she opened a running school in Prijedor.

Achievements

References

1981 births
Living people
Bosnia and Herzegovina female long-distance runners
Kenyan female long-distance runners
Kenyan female marathon runners
Olympic athletes of Bosnia and Herzegovina
Athletes (track and field) at the 2008 Summer Olympics
Athletes (track and field) at the 2012 Summer Olympics
Athletes (track and field) at the 2016 Summer Olympics
World Athletics Championships athletes for Bosnia and Herzegovina
Bosnia and Herzegovina female marathon runners
Athletes (track and field) at the 2015 European Games
European Games competitors for Bosnia and Herzegovina
Bosnia and Herzegovina people of Kenyan descent
Kenyan emigrants to Bosnia and Herzegovina